Althea Gibson defeated Angela Mortimer in the final, 6–0, 12–10 to win the women's singles tennis title at the 1956 French Championships. It was her first Grand Slam tournament title, and Gibson became the first African American to win a Grand Slam tournament.

Seeds
The seeded players are listed below. Althea Gibson is the champion; others show the round in which they were eliminated.

  Angela Mortimer (finalist)
  Dorothy Knode (third round)
  Althea Gibson (champion)
  Mary Hawton (first round)
  Zsuzsi Körmöczy (semifinals)
  Shirley Bloomer (quarterfinals)
  Christiane Mercelis (second round)
  Barbara Davidson (second round)
  Suzanne Le Besnerais (third round)
  Edda Buding (quarterfinals)
  Thelma Long (third round)
  Darlene Hard (third round)
  Annalissa Bellani (third round)
  Ginette Bucaille (third round)
  Angela Buxton (semifinals)
  Myrtil Dubois (third round)

Draw

Key
 Q = Qualifier
 WC = Wild card
 LL = Lucky loser
 r = Retired

Finals

Earlier rounds

Section 1

Section 2

Section 3

Section 4

References

External links
   on the French Open website

1956 in women's tennis
1956
1956 in French women's sport
1956 in French tennis